George Windsor-Clive may refer to:

George Windsor-Clive (politician, born 1835) (1835–1918), MP for Ludlow 1860–1885
George Windsor-Clive (politician, born 1878) (1878–1968), MP for Ludlow 1923–1945, son of above

See also
George Windsor (disambiguation)
George Clive (disambiguation)